Beron Point (Nos Beron \'nos be-'ron\) is a point on the southwest coast of Robert Island, Antarctica situated 4.5 km southeast of Negra Point, 1.7 km west of Bajo Nunatak, 1.8 km west-northwest of Zahari Point, and 3.7 km northwest of Edwards Point, as well as 5 km northeast of Ash Point on Greenwich Island.  Its shape has been enhanced by a recent glacier retreat north-northwest of the point.  It was named after the prominent Bulgarian scientist and educator Dr. Petar Beron (1795–1871).

Maps
 L.L. Ivanov et al. Antarctica: Livingston Island and Greenwich Island, South Shetland Islands. Scale 1:100000 topographic map.  Sofia: Antarctic Place-names Commission of Bulgaria, 2005.
 L.L. Ivanov. Antarctica: Livingston Island and Greenwich, Robert, Snow and Smith Islands. Scale 1:120000 topographic map.  Troyan: Manfred Wörner Foundation, 2009.

References
 Beron Point. SCAR Composite Gazetteer of Antarctica
 Bulgarian Antarctic Gazetteer. Antarctic Place-names Commission. (details in Bulgarian, basic data in English)

External links
 Beron Point. Copernix satellite image

Headlands of Robert Island
Bulgaria and the Antarctic